Sartorius AG is an international pharmaceutical and laboratory equipment supplier, covering the segments of Bioprocess Solutions and Lab Products & Services.

Recent history (since 2000)

In 2015, Sartorius Acquired cell line and process development Cellca. By 2017, the subsidiary Sartorius Stedim Cellca was in operation, operating out of a rented facility in Laupheim, but by 2019 a new facility is slated to be occupied in the Eselsberg district of Ulm.

2000Sartorius took over B. Braun Biotech International (BBI) from B. Braun Melsungen AG. BBI, the world's leading manufacturer of fermenters (bioreactor) and cell culture systems at the time, was integrated into the Sartorius group as Sartorius Stedim Systems GmbH (formerly Sartorius BBI Systems GmbH ), a subsidiary of  Sartorius Stedim Biotech GmbH.

Sartorius AG acquired the remaining shares in Viva Science and is now the sole owner.

2005Sartorius acquires 100% of the shares of Omnimark Instrument Corporation, Arizona, United States (moisture analyzers).

2007Sartorius merged its biotechnology division with the French biotech company Stedim S.A. The resulting Sartorius Stedim Biotech (SSB) is the world's leading technology provider for the biopharmaceutical industry. The new company is listed on the Paris stock exchange.

Sartorius took over the  Toha Plast GmbH , which now operates under the name  Sartorius Stedim Plastics .

2008Through its subgroup, SSB Sartorius acquired the Swiss-based Wave Biotech AG, a leading provider of single-use bioreactors.

2011Sartorius acquired the liquid handling business of the Finnish laboratory specialists Biohit. Thus, the Group expands its product portfolio in the field of laboratory instruments.

2013A new production building for the injection molding of plastic parts was opened in Göttingen. In the same year, the new Asia sales center of the Sartorius Group was inaugurated in Shanghai, from which all sales and marketing activities for China and for the entire Asia region are controlled. 

2016The company acquired two North American flow cytometry companies, IntelliCyt ($90 million) and ViroCyt ($16 million).

In July, the company, through SSB, acquired kSep Systems, which specialized in preparative centrifugation for recombinant proteins, vaccines, and cell therapy products.

In November, the SSB subdivision opened a new bioanalytical and biosafety testing facility in Boston.

2017The company acquired cell-based assay and instrumentation firm Essen BioScience, from private equity owner SFW Capital Partners, for $320 million. 

A co-development agreement between Sartorius' Cellca subsidiary and Synpromics began to test Synpromics' customized synthetic promoters on Cellca's CHO Expression Platform.

Another co-development agreement was inked with Nova Biomedical to develop a system for large-scale testing of diverse cell culture conditions.

2019The company acquired the Israel cell culture media developer and manufacturer Biological Industries. 

2020The company acquired selected assets of Danaher Corporation, including products for the research and development of cell therapies.

2021The company acquired the German cell culture media manufacturer Xell AG, the German cell and gene therapy raw materials supplier CellGenix GmbH and the German bioanalytic company ALS Automated Lab Solutions GmbH.

Products & Services

Sartorius Stedim Biotech 
 automated cell banking (cryovial handling) system
 Single-use bioreactors
 Scaledown bioreactors
 Membrane chromatography devices (membrane adsorbers)
 Manufacturing process platforms and modular manufacturing facility elements

Sartorius Stedim BioOutsource 
BioOutsource is a subsidiary of Sartorius Stedim Biotech
 Chemistry testing services focus on the analysis of therapeutic monoclonal antibodies for their physicochemical and structural properties

Sartorius Stedim Cellca 
 CHO Expression Platform, for production of biological agents

See also
 Laboratory equipment

References

External links
 Official company site
 #passionforscience
 Connect Upstream

Laboratory equipment manufacturers
Pharmaceutical companies of Germany
Technology companies established in 1870
Companies based in Lower Saxony
Research support companies
German companies established in 1870
German brands
Companies listed on the Frankfurt Stock Exchange
Companies listed on Euronext Paris
Companies in the TecDAX
Companies in the MDAX